Tiger Hill is a mountain located in Darjeeling, in the Indian State of West Bengal. It has a panoramic view of Mount Everest and Mount Kanchenjunga together.

Geography

Location

Note: The map alongside presents some of the notable locations in the subdivision. All places marked in the map are linked in the larger full screen map.

Views

At sunrise, the peaks of Kanchenjunga are illuminated before the sun is seen at lower elevations. From Tiger Hill, Mount Everest, Makalu and Lhotse are just visible. Kanchenjunga looks higher than Mt. Everest, as it is several miles closer than Everest.

On a clear day, Kurseong is visible to the south and in the distance, along with Teesta River, Mahananda River, Balason River and Mechi River meandering down to the south.

A sunrise at Tiger Hill is an impressive experience.

Senchal Wildlife Sanctuary is close to Tiger Hill.

See also 
 Chowrasta Darjeeling
 Mahakal Temple Darjeeling

References

Tourist attractions in Darjeeling
Hills of West Bengal
Geography of Darjeeling district